Ducrosia is a genus of flowering plants belonging to the family Apiaceae.

Its native range was southern Egypt to Pakistan. The plants can be found in Afghanistan, the Gulf States, Iran, Iraq, Lebanon-Syria, Oman, Pakistan, Palestine, Saudi Arabia and Yemen.

1 species, Ducrosia ismaelis  is now extinct in Egypt, but can be found in Saudi Arabia.

The genus name of Ducrosia is in honour of François-Barthélémy Ducros (1751–1822), Swiss clergyman, botanist in Nyon, Switzerland, and was a friend of Edmond Boissier who then described and published the genus in Ann. Sci. Nat., Bot., séries 3, Vol.1 on page 341 in 1844.

Known species:
Ducrosia anethifolia 
Ducrosia areysiana 
Ducrosia assadii 
Ducrosia flabellifolia 
Ducrosia inaccessa 
Ducrosia ismaelis

References

Apioideae
Apioideae genera